The Canoeing Competition at the 2005 Mediterranean Games was held in the Cuevas del Almanzora Canal in Almería, Spain from June 25 to July 1, 2005. There were just flatwater events.

Men's competition

K-1 500m

K-1 1.000m

K-2 500m

K-2 1.000m

Women's competition

K-1 500m

K-1 1.000m

Medal table

References
Results

M
Sports at the 2005 Mediterranean Games
 
Canoeing and kayaking competitions in Spain